Vadgaon Khurd is a village on the fringes of Pune, Maharashtra, India.

References

Villages in Pune district